Pursuant to the Education Act of 1976, education in Saint Kitts and Nevis is compulsory between the ages of 5 and 16.  In 1997, the gross primary enrollment rate was 97.6 percent, and the net primary enrollment rate was 88.6 percent. Primary school attendance rates were unavailable for St. Kitts & Nevis for 2001.  While enrollment rates indicate a level of commitment to education, they do not always reflect children’s participation in school.

References

 
Society of Saint Kitts and Nevis